Leon Harry Maloney (born 13 May 2001) is an English professional footballer who plays for Tweede Divisie club Jong Volendam as a winger.

Club career

Portsmouth
He made his Portsmouth first team debut on 8 January 2019 coming on in a 2–0 win against Southend United in the Checkatrade Trophy.

On 13 November 2018, Maloney was loaned out to Bognor Regis Town for the rest of 2018, to gain some first team playing experience to make the jump from academy to senior football. On 22 February 2019, he was loaned out to the same club again, this time for the remainder of the season.

On 30 April 2019, Maloney was offered a third year scholarship with Portsmouth. He scored his first goal for the club, and his first professional goal, in an EFL Trophy tie against Northampton Town on 3 December 2019.

Volendam
On 30 January 2020 Maloney signed a contract to go and play for the Dutch club FC Volendam. After making 7 appearances in the 2020–21 Eerste Divisie for the club, he played only for their Under-21 squad in the third-tier Tweede Divisie since then.

Career statistics

References

2001 births
Living people
People from the Isle of Wight
English footballers
Association football midfielders
Portsmouth F.C. players
Bognor Regis Town F.C. players
FC Volendam players
Isthmian League players
Eerste Divisie players
Tweede Divisie players
English expatriate footballers
Expatriate footballers in the Netherlands
English expatriate sportspeople in the Netherlands